Vijay Babu (or Vijaybabu), born in Andhra Pradesh is an Indian actor and producer who works primarily in Tamil cinema. He was most active in the early 80s and later switched to a successful career in Television serials. His son Ramana is also an actor working in Tamil cinema.

His popular films include Oru Veedu Oru Ulagam, Oru Vidukadhai Oru Thodarkadhai and Padikkadavan
. In 1991, he produced a movie title Eswari under the banner of Sreesakthi Films Combines, with Anand Babu and Gautami as the leading pair.

Filmography
 This is an incomplete list you may help to expand the list

Tamil
 Oru Veedu Oru Ulagam - 1978 (debut)
 Oru Vidukadhai Oru Thodarkadhai - 1979
 Oru Koyil Iru Dheebangal - 1979
  Sri Devi - 1980
 Kumari Pennin Ullathile - 1980
 Madhavi Vandhal - 1980
 Paruvathin Vasalile - 1980
 Meenakshi - 1980
 Muyalakku Moonu Kaal - 1980
 Rusi Kanda Poonai - 1980
 Pournami Nilavil- 1980
 Engal Vathiyar as Ragunath - 1980 
 Veli Thandiya Velladu - 1980
 Kadavulin Theerpu - 1981
 Meendum Sandhippom - 1981
 Engamma Maharani - 1981
 Tharayil Vaazhum Meengal - 1981
 Kaalam Orunaal Maarum - 1981
 Thunaivi - 1982
 Kasappum Inippum  - 1983
 Padikkadavan - 1985
 Agni Theertham - 1990
 Aarathi Edungadi - 1990
 Uthamaputhiran - 2010
 Chakra - 2021

Malayalam
 Anupallavi - 1979

Television
 2002-2003 Varam (Sun TV)
 2005-2006 Anandham (Sun TV)
 2012-2013 Aaha (Vijay TV)

References 

Telugu male actors
Living people
Indian male film actors
Male actors in Tamil cinema
Male actors in Telugu cinema
Year of birth missing (living people)